The Idalion Tablet is a 5th-century BC bronze tablet from Idalium, Cyprus. The script of the tablet is in the Cypriot syllabary and the inscription itself is in the Arcadocypriot dialect of Greek. 

The tablet was kept in the ancient official depository of the temple of Athena on the western acropolis of Idalion, where it was discovered in 1850 by a farmer from the village of Dali, Cyprus. It was purchased by Honoré Théodoric d'Albert de Luynes, who donated it to the Bibliothèque Nationale de France in 1862. Today it is kept in the Cabinet des médailles, Paris. However, the script was not deciphered until after the 1870 discovery of the Idalion bilingual.

It is of exceptional importance for the history of the Cypriot kingdoms. It is engraved on both sides with a long inscription recording a contract entered into by 'the king and the city' and gives a reward to a family of physicians who provided free health services for the casualties when the city was besieged by the Persians and the Kitians in 478-470 BC. It tells us about the political system and socio-economic conditions during the war. The joint decision by the king and citizens shows the democratic nature of the city, similar to Greek models. It also tells of the most ancient social welfare system known.

Cypriot syllabary and Greek

Approximately two lines of the text state as follows:

...they ordered Onasilon the (son) of Onasikupron the physician and the brothers to heal the men those in the battle wounded without fee. The text is read from right to left. 

Below is the Greek translation, associated with the Cypriot characters. Line 3 starts with Cypriot character ro (looks like a 'loop of rope, open end down'; the loop is the character's top half), and line 4 starts with Cypriot ma (an 'X', with a small upside-down-karat in the top crux):

...anógon-(a-no-ko-ne) Onasilon-(o-na-si-lo-ne) ton Onasikuprón-(to-no-na-si-ku-po-(Line 3)ro-ne) ton iatéran-(to-ni-ja-te-ra-ne) kas-(ka-se) tos-(to-se) kasignétos-(ka-si-ke-ne-to-se) iasthai-(i-ja-sa-ta-i) tos-(to-se) (=men)a(n)thrópos-(a-to-ro-po-se) tos-(to-se) i(n) tái-(i-ta-i) makhái-(ma-ka-i) ikmamenos-(i-ki-(Line 4)ma-me-no-se) aneu-(a-ne-u) misthón-(mi-si-to-ne)...

See also

Cypriot syllabary
Idalium

References

Citations

Sources

Bronze Age Cyprus
Greek inscriptions
Ancient Cyprus
5th-century BC works
Cities in ancient Cyprus
Collection of the Cabinet des Médailles, Paris